Estádio 1º de Maio de Maputo is a multi-purpose stadium in Maputo, Mozambique.  It is currently used mostly for football matches and is the home stadium of Grupo Desportivo de Maputo.  The stadium holds 8,000 people.

Desportivo
Multi-purpose stadiums in Mozambique
Buildings and structures in Maputo
Sport in Maputo